Civilized is the third and final album by indie rock band Stellastarr. It was released in the United States on July 7, 2009.

Track listing
 "Robot"  – 3:00
 "Freak Out"  – 3:27
 "Tokyo Sky"  – 4:16
 "Numbers"  – 3:50
 "Graffiti Eyes"  – 3:41
 "Prom Zombie"  – 3:26
 "Warchild"  – 3:33
 "People"  – 3:15
 "Move On"  – 4:02
 "Sonja Cries"  – 4:45
 "Underneath the Knife"  – 3:11 (iTunes only bonus track)

References

External links 
 Official MySpace

2009 albums
Stellastarr albums